The 1986–87 Los Angeles Lakers season was the 41st season of the franchise, 39th in the National Basketball Association (NBA) and 27th in Los Angeles. Coming from a shocking defeat to the Houston Rockets in the previous season's Western Conference Finals in five games, where they won the first game, but proceeded to drop the next four, the Lakers avenged their playoff upset by making the NBA Finals for the sixth time in the 1980s. Prior to reaching the NBA Finals, in the playoffs, the Lakers swept the Denver Nuggets in three games in the First Round, defeated the Golden State Warriors in five games in the Semi-finals, and swept the Seattle SuperSonics in four games in the Conference Finals. This team was named one of the 10 greatest teams in NBA history.

The highlight of the season saw the Lakers winning the NBA Finals, and their tenth NBA title (fifth in Los Angeles) over the defending NBA champions and rivals, the Boston Celtics, in six games. This marked the third and final time the Lakers and Celtics faced off against each other in the NBA Finals in the 1980s, as well as the last time the Lakers and Celtics faced off against each other in the NBA Finals until 2008, where the Celtics defeated the Lakers 4–2 to win their 17th NBA championship. The two teams would then meet again in 2010, where the Lakers defeated the Celtics 4–3 to win their 16th NBA championship.

Draft picks

Roster

Regular season

Season standings

Record vs. opponents

Game log

Playoffs

|- align="center" bgcolor="#ccffcc"
| 1
| April 23
| Denver
| W 128–95
| James Worthy (28)
| Mychal Thompson (9)
| Magic Johnson (14)
| The Forum17,505
| 1–0
|- align="center" bgcolor="#ccffcc"
| 2
| April 25
| Denver
| W 139–127
| Kareem Abdul-Jabbar (28)
| A. C. Green (13)
| Magic Johnson (15)
| The Forum17,297
| 2–0
|- align="center" bgcolor="#ccffcc"
| 3
| April 29
| @ Denver
| W 140–103
| Byron Scott (25)
| A. C. Green (10)
| Magic Johnson (14)
| McNichols Sports Arena15,137
| 3–0
|-

|- align="center" bgcolor="#ccffcc"
| 1
| May 5
| Golden State
| W 125–116
| James Worthy (28)
| Magic Johnson (12)
| Magic Johnson (14)
| The Forum17,505
| 1–0
|- align="center" bgcolor="#ccffcc"
| 2
| May 7
| Golden State
| W 116–101
| Kareem Abdul-Jabbar (25)
| three players tied (8)
| Michael Cooper (12)
| The Forum17,505
| 2–0
|- align="center" bgcolor="#ccffcc"
| 3
| May 9
| @ Golden State
| W 133–108
| James Worthy (28)
| Mychal Thompson (12)
| Magic Johnson (14)
| Oakland–Alameda County Coliseum Arena15,025
| 3–0
|- align="center" bgcolor="#ffcccc"
| 4
| May 10
| @ Golden State
| L 121–129
| Byron Scott (28)
| A. C. Green (12)
| Michael Cooper (10)
| Oakland–Alameda County Coliseum Arena15,025
| 3–1
|- align="center" bgcolor="#ccffcc"
| 5
| May 12
| Golden State
| W 116–108
| James Worthy (23)
| Kareem Abdul-Jabbar (9)
| Magic Johnson (13)
| The Forum17,505
| 4–1
|-

|- align="center" bgcolor="#ccffcc"
| 1
| May 16
| Seattle
| W 87–82
| James Worthy (27)
| Magic Johnson (7)
| Magic Johnson (11)
| The Forum17,505
| 1–0
|- align="center" bgcolor="#ccffcc"
| 2
| May 19
| Seattle
| W 112–104
| James Worthy (30)
| A. C. Green (14)
| Magic Johnson (10)
| The Forum17,505
| 2–0
|- align="center" bgcolor="#ccffcc"
| 3
| May 23
| @ Seattle
| W 122–121
| James Worthy (39)
| Kareem Abdul-Jabbar (10)
| Magic Johnson (11)
| Seattle Center Coliseum14,657
| 3–0
|- align="center" bgcolor="#ccffcc"
| 4
| May 25
| @ Seattle
| W 133–102
| James Worthy (26)
| A. C. Green (13)
| Magic Johnson (12)
| Seattle Center Coliseum14,477
| 4–0
|-

|- align="center" bgcolor="#ccffcc"
| 1
| June 2
| Boston
| W 126–113
| James Worthy (33)
| Kareem Abdul-Jabbar (10)
| Magic Johnson (13)
| The Forum17,505
| 1–0
|- align="center" bgcolor="#ccffcc"
| 2
| June 4
| Boston
| W 141–122
| Byron Scott (24)
| Johnson, Rambis (5)
| Magic Johnson (20)
| The Forum17,505
| 2–0
|- align="center" bgcolor="#ffcccc"
| 3
| June 7
| @ Boston
| L 103–109
| Magic Johnson (32)
| Magic Johnson (11)
| Magic Johnson (9)
| Boston Garden14,890
| 2–1
|- align="center" bgcolor="#ccffcc"
| 4
| June 9
| @ Boston
| W 107–106
| Magic Johnson (29)
| Kareem Abdul-Jabbar (11)
| Cooper, Johnson (5)
| Boston Garden14,890
| 3–1
|- align="center" bgcolor="#ffcccc"
| 5
| June 11
| @ Boston
| L 108–123
| Magic Johnson (29)
| Magic Johnson (8)
| Magic Johnson (12)
| Boston Garden14,890
| 3–2
|- align="center" bgcolor="#ccffcc"
| 6
| June 14
| Boston
| W 106–93
| Kareem Abdul-Jabbar (32)
| Mychal Thompson (9)
| Magic Johnson (19)
| The Forum17,505
| 4–2
|-

Player statistics
Note: GP= Games played; MPG= Minutes per Game; REB = Rebounds; AST = Assists; STL = Steals; BLK = Blocks; PTS = Points; PPG = Points per Game

Season

Playoffs

Award winners
 Magic Johnson, NBA Most Valuable Player Award
 Magic Johnson, NBA Finals Most Valuable Player Award
 Michael Cooper, NBA Defensive Player of the Year Award
 Magic Johnson, All-NBA First Team
 Michael Cooper, NBA All-Defensive First Team

Transactions

References

 Lakers on Database Basketball
 Lakers on Basketball Reference
 

Los Angeles Lakers seasons
NBA championship seasons
Los
Western Conference (NBA) championship seasons
Los Angle
Los Angle